Mikki Piras is an American former slalom canoeist who competed in the mid-1970s. She won a bronze medal in the mixed C-2 event at the 1975 ICF Canoe Slalom World Championships in Skopje.

References

American female canoeists
Living people
Year of birth missing (living people)
Medalists at the ICF Canoe Slalom World Championships
21st-century American women